Tricia Middleton (born 1972) is an installation artist based in Montreal, Quebec. Middleton's artistic practice often involves the creation of elaborate, large-scale installations built out of a variety of materials including trash, wax, craft supplies, and other ephemera. She frequently re-purposes excess material from her studio practice in creating new installation and sculpture-based work. Her work has been collected by the Musée d'art contemporain de Montréal.

Notable Exhibitions
In 2009, Middleton exhibited a large installation at the Musée d'art contemporain de Montreal, titled Dark Souls. Taking its title from a novel by Nikolai Gogol, Dark Souls was designed to resemble a decaying bourgeois parlour and involved five connecting rooms, each filled with garbage and refuse, towering sculptures, and two video projections.

In 2012, Middleton created a site-specific installation at the Oakville Galleries at Gairloch Gardens. Titled Form is the Destroyer of Force, Without Severity There Can Be No Mercy, Middleton's installation, like Dark Souls, took found objects like shoes, vases, tea sets, and artificial roses and transformed them into uncanny assemblages covered in wax and glitter. The installation referenced the domestic architecture of the Oakville Galleries at Gairloch Gardens, turning the gallery into a fantastical home in decay.

Middleton participated in a large-scale group exhibition titled Misled by Nature: Contemporary Art and the Baroque organized by the National Gallery of Canada, and exhibited at the Art Gallery of Alberta in Edmonton in 2013, and the Museum of Contemporary Canadian Art in Toronto in 2014. The exhibition, which featured other prominent Canadian and international artists including David Altmejd, Yinka Shonibare MBE, and Sarah Sze, considered material excess and theatricality in recent installation art, and questioned the nature-culture divide. Other notable group exhibitions include Nothing to Declare: Current Sculpture from Canada at The Power Plant in Toronto in 2009, and the Quebec Triennial at the Musée d'art contemporain in Montreal in 2008.

Represented by Jessica Bradley Gallery in Toronto, Middleton recently exhibited small sculptures based on her prior large-scale installations at the commercial gallery, in an exhibition titled Tricia Middleton: Making Friends with Yourself.

Further reading

References

External links
 Tricia Middleton's Artist Page
  Tricia Middleton's page at ISCP

Living people
Artists from Montreal
Artists from Vancouver
Concordia University alumni
1972 births
Canadian installation artists
Women installation artists
Emily Carr University of Art and Design alumni
21st-century Canadian women artists